Gerald F. Spiess (January 24, 1940 – June 18, 2019) was an American school teacher best known for having sailed his  home-built sailboat Yankee Girl solo across the Atlantic Ocean in 1979 and across the Pacific in 1981.

Sailboat construction 
Spiess designed and built the boat in his garage in suburban White Bear Lake, Minnesota, from plywood. After a test launch in the local lake, Spiess transported the boat to the East Coast for launch. He sailed from Norfolk, Virginia, on June 1, 1979, arriving in Falmouth, England, after a 54-day Atlantic crossing.

Legacy 
In 1991, a tribute song  was written about Mr. Spiess journey with Yankee Girl.

See also
Tinkerbelle, the story of a similar sailing feat in 1965.

References

Further reading
Broken Seas. Bree, Marlin.  2005.  Marlor Publishing. 

1940 births
2019 deaths
American sailors
Single-handed sailors